The Nyakyusa (also called the Sokile, Ngonde or Nkonde) are a Bantu ethnolinguistic group who live in the fertile mountains of southern Mbeya Region of Tanzania. They speak the Nyakyusa language, a member of the Bantu language family. In 1993 the Nyakusa population was estimated to number 1,050,000, with 750,000 living in Tanzania. Nyakyusa are marked as highly educated and eager agriculturists . The Nyakyusa are colonising people where success and survival depended on individual effort. Nyakyusa have managed to  collect  vast wealth from trade and agriculture than any tribe in Tanzania. .

Historically, they were called the 'Ngonde' below the Songwe River in British Nyasaland, and 'Nyakyusa' above the river in German territory.  The two groups were identical in language and culture, so much so that the Germans referred to the Nyakyusa region above the Songwe River and its people as 'Konde', at least until 1935.

History

Origins
According to their oral history, they traced their roots to an Ancient Nubian Queen called Nyanseba, She was abducted by a warrior and a herdsmen, it is said the herdsmen turned the rulership of Empresses to Emperors, but the power and influence of women among the Nyakyusa can be seen through in their traditions the Boys take their mother’s clan name while the girls take their father’s clan name.
the mushan are one of nyakyusa clan

Colonial history
The Scots had founded Karonga in 1875. In 1889, the treaties of Harry Johnston reduced the state of regular war between the Konde Chiefs and the Arabs. In 1895 the British hanged Mlozi, a slave trader.  Finally the area was incorporated as 'British Central Africa', with Karonga itself fortified with palisades on the lake and defended on the other three sides with trenches, which could be swept from brick bastions.  Gates protected the trenches of the fort with two cannons, one Norden field machine-gun, and 300 to 400 armed inhabitants, who were ready even during peacetime.  Administrators and warehouses were to be found inside—the houses of the inhabitants were outside—within their own palisades, protected by the guns of the fort.  It is said that slave raids were conducted almost within sight of Karonga, leaving the Nyakyusa and others uncertain as to whether or not to support Mlozi or a European power.  Three hundred to five hundred warriors finally supported England.  Karonga was important as England's main support base for the 'Stephenson Road', from Lake Nyasa to Lake Tanganyika, which by 1892 was already falling apart due to a lack of funds.

In contrast to the Ngonde, the Nyakyusa were unsophisticated and isolated from contact with the outside world, had unfortified villages, little to do with the ivory trade, slavery, or Arabs, or anything east of the effectively protective Livingston Mountains, and kept their over one hundred small chiefdoms independent, at least until the arrival of the Europeans. Being warriors, they were able to repeatedly repulse the attacks of the Sangu of Merere and the Ngoni.

European accounts

European travelers, being strongly impressed with cleanliness and neatness, seem to have found it north of Lake Nyasa.  Joseph Thomson, in To the Central African Lakes and Back (1881), comes close to describing the Nyakyusa, "It seemed a perfect Arcadia....  Imagine a perfectly level plain, from which all weeds, garbage, and things unsightly are carefully cleared away.  Dotted here and there are a number of immense shady sycamores with branches almost as large as a separate tree.  Every few spaces are charmingly neat circucular huts, with conical roofs, and walls hanging out all round with the clay worked prettily into rounded bricks, and daubed symmetrically with spots.  (These have always been considered normal and typical, but due to the German 'hut tax' the rectangular huts began to dominate)  The grass thatching is also very neat.  The 'tout ensemble' renders these huts a place in any nobleman's garden."

Merensky, in Deutsch Arbeit am Nyaßa, quotes a missionary: "We wandered through magnificent banana groves and elegant, cleanly built huts of our Nyakyusa.  When one contemplates the people it appears as though they celebrated a festival every day.   They look as clean as though they knew no work.  One sees women and children picking fallen fruit from the ground while men and young people walk mostly hand in hand....  The entire image gives a charming picture, really more lovely than words can express."  Missionary Richard is quoted in much the same way.  "One could imagine being in a garden on Lake Geneva."  Quoting Major von Wissmann, "They are as happy as Africans can be...modest, hospitable, and have until now been able to keep dangerous enemies off of their necks and keep their independence."

The film Mother Night is set among the Chaga and Nyakyusa people of Africa, and claims to be based on the funereal rituals of these tribes.    At his father's death, the protagonist, Danny, is required by custom to have sex with all seven of his widowed stepmothers in one night.

Konde Revolt

By 1897 the Germans were no longer happy with their status in East Africa and we have what can be called the Konde Revolt of 1897, the three cornered dispute between the military, missionaries and the Nyakyusa with some Kinga, including the involvement of German Safari Conductor Bauer.  Zugführer Bauer was personally acquainted with Baron v. Eltz, and almost all of the missionaries in the area, and at least some of the Chiefs.  Almost everyone knew Bauer but few knew his rank.  (Even Charsley  in his book lists him as a lieutenant.)

Von Eltz, who had no Askari available, decided to cede the administration of justice to missionaries in 'trifles and punishment', forcing affairs to really hit the fan on December 2, 1893, with Lutheran Missionary Schumann writing, "Five cattle have been stolen by Muambeneke on the Rungue-Mountain.  I have tried to influence Muambeneke, with however, no results."  Missionary Schumann continues, "On December 23, 1893 a different chief had also stolen cattle but is said to be in the process of returning them.  Muambeneke refuses to return his stolen cattle etc. saying he does not even know the 'White' (Elz) in Rumbira (Langenburg), maybe you wish the cattle etc. etc....  May I point out that the protectorate forces have not yet introduced themselves as the higher judiciary to the black  population, there is no present concept of the difference between the protectorate forces and the missionaries.  In the eyes of the inhabitants they are one and the same."  (this last probably refers to Bauer.)  "I (Schumann) have even been accused of judging with a gun in my hand."  August 8, 1894 Zugführer Bauer writes that Häuptling Makiemba said, "If one wanted somethingh from him than the Germans should come to him for he was afraid of Nyassa (Lake?).  On the other hand if we wanted war he was ready".  Governor Scheele writes "...Provisionally no company is to be sent there...".

Finally in October 1894 Bauer reports taking cattle away from Chief Masakiwande and burning the village down because of cattle theft and even though many inhabitants brought their grievances to him to be adjudicated he could find none to act as porters and in the confusion ten Askari were forced to drag Bauer's loads to the mission Manow.  As Bauer listened to their complaints they abruptly dismissed him.  On November 5, 1894 he (Bauer) reports, "Muarukwa was not in agreement with the return of 10 cattle saying the Europeans in Langenburg had nothing to do with it".  The issue ended as Bauer burned down this village and taking away the cattle, thereby killing five men and three women.

The situation is completely out of hand by 1897 with Chief Makelimba having two Askari 'murdered' on February 5, with Bauer barely getting away (knapper Not Davon) and by December 1897, following Bauer' departure for Germany (he may have smelled trouble coming) the Nyakusa and some of the Kinga chiefs had gotten together to rid the land of all missionaries and other whites. The German authorities were late in learning of the plot from the missionaries who had not pass the information on.  Lt. Alpons claimed he went with a troop of forty-five Askari who were then ambushedby more than two thousand Konde (Hehe style), who being certain of victory did not use their spears, for they wanted to strip Alpons naked and put a copper ring on his head for taunting them for their nakedness, wishing to have the konde working, buying cloth, earning money, and probably paying taxes, the Konde were defeated by superior firepower.  Missionary Maaß reported seeing roughly 30 dead Konde in just one area.

The entire revolt seems to have been blamed on Lt. Alpons and Missionary Cristoph Bunk of the Lutheran Missionary Gesellschaft for not having notified the military.  The missionaries claimed Lt. Alpons had deliberately provoked the Konde.  As a result Missionry Bunk was transferred to Ubena and Lt. Alpons was recalled as district commander.

Culture and society
Collectively, the Nyakyusa are traditionally thought of as being related to the Kinga of the Livingston Mountains, who had themselves spread westwards as immigrants.  'Nobles', ruling the land, were credited with divine powers, lived in strict religious seclusion, their chiefs (Princes), being strangled by their councillors in old age or illness in order to maintain rain, fertility, and the health of the village.  The chief's advisers were never his kinsmen, but only non-hereditary commoners with considerable power over the chief.

The Nyakyusa were a colonizing people where success and survival depended on individual effort.  According to M. Wilson slavery was reported as being totally unknown in 1892, although the slave trade certainly existed in the vicinity of the Konde of Karonga. They lived in very small chiefdoms, not in groups of relatives, but in groups of age-mates attempting to live in harmony to avoid misfortune.

The Nyakyusa were eager agriculturists.  They practiced intensive crop rotation with corn, beans, squash, sorghum, millet, yams, etc., with banana plantations stretching for miles.  Clearing and hoeing the land three to four hours a day was the responsibility of the men and his sons, never the women.  The crops were used for food, beer, and hospitality, as well as for sale and barter.  Neither old age nor high status excused a man from his duty to hoe.  They were said to fear leaving their area for concern of being unable to exist without their accustomed food of meat, milk, bananas etc. Each year at the beginning of the rainy season, the Nyakyusa assemble at a place called 'Chikungu' where their chief Kyungu calls for rain. All villagers are told not to light fire in their homes in the morning of the ritual rain-calling ceremony. All the villagers wait for the sacred fire from the shrine called moto ufya to be distributed.

Arbitration in disputes by a friend or neighbor is considered very important.  The headman or prince had no power to enforce decisions and while there was no attempt to quiet a quarrel it is considered most proper to arrive at a settlement through some group opinion of equals, established before adolescence, resting on friendship, assistance, and cooperation.

There were no clans, or descent groups with a common name and by the third generation kinship bonds were often forgotten.  Tradition rarely mentions warfare, although boundary disputes were normal and could lead to fights.  Hunters, not warriors, were heroes, and they hunted for the protection of life and property, although the selection of weapons indicates they also organized for war.  Missionary Nauhaus was told of a boundary dispute in November, 1893, in which six men fell on one side and only one on the other.  Such friction was not called war, "I was told it only happens so that there would be something to talk about".

Outside the chiefdom the world could also be dangerous.  A journey of twenty-five miles could take three days because of the need to often take cover.  Not only were there unfriendly villages, but also because leopards, elephants, buffalos, hippos, crocodiles, etc., were plentiful. Before the arrival of German missionaries, the Nyakyusa just 'cast their dead away' or left them at 'itago' to die.

Societal life
The women were dominated by the older men.  They lived at their husband's residence, married ten years earlier than the men, lacked solidarity, developed little leadership, and had no kinsmen to protect their interests.  Missionaries reported adultery, divorce, litigation, and marital instability to be widespread.  The Nyakyusa were accused of having a 'frivolous' attitude towards marriage, for few women of thirty were still married to their first husband and were very often on their fifth or sixth.  Women spent thirty hours a week fetching wood, and only when co-wives were sisters, or an aunt or niece, were they expected to work together regularly.  Intense competition for the position of favorite among a man's various wives was thought by the missionaries to be at least partly responsible for the low status of women, which was still considered higher than other tribes.

Age-groups dominated their whole lives.  Boys guarded the fields and cattle and lived in separate camps starting at about ten years of age and lasting a lifetime.  Since the women married much earlier than the men, incest was of great concern to the Nyakyusa and was resolved by putting fathers in one village and sons in another.  Up to the age of ten or eleven the boys herded their father's cattle in groups, then hoed the field of their fathers and continued to eat their mother's food.  They no longer slept in the houses of their fathers but joined an age-grade village of boys with a separate leader, laws, and customs and could be considered members of two villages.  Men and boys were expected to eat regularly with age-mates and were encouraged to bring home two or three friends to eat; parents being proud when they did so, for if a young man often came home alone to eat, his father could beat him, or even take a spear and wound him.  Isolates were not easily tolerated.  The following is from M. Wilson, 'This great fool comes alone to my place, again and again, it is good to eat with friends or go around in groups of four or five.'  Eating with age-mates was considered right, proper, and moral.  It was considered improper, unseemly, and somewhat immoral to eat with juniors or women.  Women ate alone with their young children and unmarried daughters.

Sexual morality depended on the separation of the sexual activities, 'If he sleeps at home he will hear what his parents talk about at night, the night is always full of lewd talk; he may even see them undressing.  He will grow up a fool.' Once again > Wilson

When an oversupply of young bachelors and a shortage of unmarried girls was created, it was resolved by forming another settlement. It was only after a young man had his wife permanently with him that he was able to have his own fields and eat its produce.  Cultivation of land demanded the cooperation of a man and a woman, while elaborate cooking demanded a woman.  Until the man was married he still worked his father's fields and ate at his father's house.

When the oldest sons of a chief reached thirty-three to thirty-five years of age the father handed over the country's government to them in the 'coming out', a ceremony of great pomp.  All fires were now extinguished and new fires, kindled by friction, were lit.  Since the sons were now new owners of a chiefdom, other princedoms were raided for cattle and food; they also raided their own father's land for milk, cattle, and bananas.

"Swagger"
Swaggering parades provided feasts, dances, the exhibition of beautiful bodies, and the physical strength of both men and women.  Parading ornaments, fine clothes, or splendid cattle were all part of it.  A father would say 'swagger first', if a son wished to marry young.

Since a bachelor was thought to be a fiercer warrior than a married man, marriages were often delayed, for while urbanity and good temper were praised, readiness to fight was a valuable quality useful in war.  'We did not drive away violent men in the old days; they will fight with us in the future.'  Swagger display was felt to be appropriate, particularly in bachelors, but married men also fought with skill, and none developed a military kingdom.  They just raided for their neighbor's cattle, leaving the missionaries confused.

Subsistence
The Nyakyusa were primarily herders and banana cultivators, with cattle and milk being most important.  Small cattle, being their greatest pride, were tied up at night and milked only by the men.  Women were not allowed to have anything to do with cattle, and played no part in public life. They were expect to show obedience, respect, and use 'yes, my lord' when addressed, and were reported to be totally dominated by the men, but were still thought, by the missionaries, to have a position higher and better than that of other tribes.  Cattle for bridewealth, however, were considered vital and gave men even more control, even though the missionaries assumed the position of women was not bad.

While the Nyakyusa were expert mat makers, they produced no pots, cloth, iron, or salt, and trade remained very small.  The only trade was with the Kinga when the Nyakyusa exchanged their surplus food for weapons and agricultural implements of considerable artistic merit.  While the trade in weapons and tools with the Kinga was important, marriage partners with Kinga women was not, for Kinga women were considered too dirty to marry.

The outbreak of rinderpest may not have devastated their herds until 1892–1896.  The protection of cattle from raiders by day and witches by night, long remained the traditional community activity. People continued to use bark, home-woven cloth, or animal skins, at least until German calico came in.  The chief's power depended upon his right to demand food, high bride price for his daughters, and the anticipation of entertainment.

It was the Nyakyusa's practice to work together in community groups, each family doing so two or three times each year.  From the missionaries' point of view, they found 'fireside company' very important and stressed the obligation of eating and drinking together with urban manners and friendliness.  They found merry conversation to be a discussion between equals, finding it to be an outstanding example of the sustainable comfort obtainable in African life within a simple Iron Age culture.

Cultivation carried prestige and provided for the hospitality on which the Nyakyusa community rested and depended.  Great stress was placed on geniality and praise was placed on man for being a good mixer.  Considerable pressure compelled both men and women to cultivate diligently, but not too conspicuously for each must keep in step with his neighbors.  Pressure helped keep laggards up to the mark and kept the energetic from getting too far ahead.

There was some small trade between the various small Nyakyusa princedoms. However, economic links between princes was flimsy at best and exchanges were most commonly within a chiefdom.  There was actually very little trade between the various chiefdoms, for a state of war always existed among the Nyakyusa, whether actual or potential.  The weakness of any central authority was indicated by the recurrent civil wars before the Ngoni invasion.

Belief system
The Nyakyusa stood naked before evil. Notions of reward and punishment in an after-life were lacking.  Religion was this-worldly and concerned with fertility and prosperity.  They feared punishment on this earth; and according to Monica Wilson 'a woman's barrenness was the result of her failings and she would be oppressed with guilt'. Only the coming of Christianity did the fear of burning in hell appear with rewards and punishments reserved for an after-life.

Medicines
Medicines were important in winning success, cultivation, herding, hunting, love, war, treatment of the sick, protection and retaliation, or even directly harming an enemy and defending against witches.  It could be used against a thief or adulterer or put on houses or fields to bring ills quite legally.  Medicine could be good or evil, legal or illegal, and able help or to harm.

Spiritual Beliefs
Belief in existence of witches was pertinent in the world view of the Nyakyusa.  It was believed that certain people flew on pythons, harming people and cattle at night.  These witches inherited their power and pythons from a parent, and greed was the typical motive for harming men and cattle.  Pythons lusted for the meat and milk available at the funeral of those killed.  Sexual dreams were not thought to come from witchcraft, even though the witches always went naked, flew through the air riding their pythons.

Some people in a village had the power to see and fight witches in their dreams and were called 'defenders', the most important being the village headmen.  The visions and power of the defenders came from the same source as the witches and pythons.   The defenders worked within the law and morality, while the witches acted selfishly against the law and morality.  Defenders worked through dreams at night. They were powerful, using their power to punish wrongdoers and acted particularly to protect cattle, for all lived on bananas, beans, and the milk of cattle, and even though witches could avoid defenders they were considered pillars of society.  They could see and drive away witches and cause them or their children to fall ill, all through the 'Power of the Python', the 'Breath of Man', the 'curse', or general public opinion.  No-one admitted to having python power: it would have been boastful, proud, and ill-mannered.

It was not just the lack of hospitality that shocked people and could bring on the 'Breath of Man'.  Bad behavior towards parents or in-laws, swearing at or hitting a husband, having children after a daughter-in law has reached puberty, and indications of pride, could all bring on lingering illness.  Still, in general the Konde were thought of as brave and intelligent.

Witches are usually described as isolated and unpopular, proud men who treated neighbors with disdain and were silent in public, and women who were glum and failed to greet other women and inquire after their children.  Witches seldom acted without reason: they act from greed or hatred, and against those with whom they have a grudge.

Beginning with childhood, most Nyakyusa have a lively fear of witchcraft, lasting a lifetime.  When a man was convicted of witchcraft he could be forced to move from a village and sometimes from the chiefdom.  A woman was generally divorced, but soon remarried.  Rarely was a supposed witch killed, for a witch was too useful in war to be lost to the chiefdom.

If there were doubts regarding accusations of witchcraft, 'Umwafi' was resorted to.  If, in drinking Umwafi, a person did not vomit, he or she was thought to be guilty.  Doubters claimed that each family chose members who vomited easily.  At times entire groups of people were tested with the 'Umwafi Ordeal' in order to see where the trouble was coming from.  According to Monica Wilson the last case seems to have been in 1932.

See also
List of ethnic groups in Tanzania
History of Tanzania
History of Malawi

References

 Arnold, Bernd. (Steuer und Lohnarbeit im Südwesten von Deutsch-   Ostafrika,1891 bis 1916)
 Bauer, Andreus. (Raising the Flag of War)
 Charsley, S.R.  (The Princes of Nyakyusa)
 Ethnologue report: Nyakyusa
 Iliffe, John.  (A Modern History of Tanganyika)
 Merensky, A.  (Deutsche Arbeit am Nyaßa)
 Mwakikagile, Godfrey (Africa and the West) 
 Oliver, Roland. (Sir Harry Johnston & the Scramble for Africa)
 Tew, Mary.  (Peoples of the Lake Nyasa Region)
 Wilson, Monica.  (Good Company)

Ethnic groups in Tanzania
Ethnic groups in Malawi
Indigenous peoples of East Africa